The 2018 Canoe Slalom World Cup was a series of five races in 5 canoeing and kayaking categories organized by the International Canoe Federation (ICF). It was the 31st edition. The men's C2 event was removed from the World Cup program before the start of the season by the ICF and was replaced by the mixed C2 event. This was the first season when points were awarded also for the Extreme K1 events.

Calendar 

The series opened with World Cup Race 1 in Liptovský Mikuláš, Slovakia (22–24 June) and ended with the World Cup Final in La Seu d'Urgell, Spain (7–9 September) for the traditional canoe slalom events. The World Championships counted for the overall world cup standings of the Extreme K1 events, but not for the traditional canoe slalom events.

Standings 
The winner of each race was awarded 60 points (double points were awarded for the World Cup Final for all the competitors who reach at least the semifinal stage, double points were also awarded for the World Championships in Extreme K1 events). Points for lower places differed from one category to another. Every participant was guaranteed at least 2 points for participation and 5 points for qualifying for the semifinal run (10 points in the World Cup Final). If two or more athletes or boats were equal on points, the ranking was determined by their positions in the World Cup Final.

Points 
World Cup points were awarded on the results of each race at each event as follows:

Results

World Cup Race 1 
22–24 June in Liptovský Mikuláš, Slovakia

World Cup Race 2 
29 June – 1 July in Kraków, Poland

World Cup Race 3 
6–8 July in Augsburg, Germany

World Cup Race 4 
31 August – 2 September in Tacen, Slovenia. The semifinals and finals of the women's C1 and men's K1 events that were scheduled for 2 September were canceled due to floods. The results of the heats were taken as final results for the world cup standings. The extreme K1 events were also canceled.

World Cup Final 
7–9 September in La Seu d'Urgell, Spain

World Championships 
25-30 September in Rio de Janeiro, Brazil

See also 
 2018 ICF Canoe Slalom World Championships

References

External links 
 International Canoe Federation

Canoe Slalom World Cup
Canoe Slalom World Cup